Heilbad Heiligenstadt is a spa town in Thuringia, Germany. It is the capital of the Eichsfeld district.

Geography
Heiligenstadt is approximately 14 km east of the tripoint where the states of Thuringia, Hesse and Lower Saxony meet. It lies on the upper course of the river Leine (a tributary of the Aller) that flows through the town from east to west and is joined near the centre of the town by the Geislede.

South of the town is the Iberg, a 453.2 m tall peak located in the Heiligenstadt Stadtwald, which forms part of the Naturpark Eichsfeld-Hainich-Werratal.

Local subdivisions
 Bernterode
 Flinsberg, the geographical centre of Germany.
 Günterode
 Kalteneber
 Rengelrode

History
 Heiligenstadt was first mentioned in 973.
 In 1022 it was acquired by the archbishop of Mainz.
 In 1227, the town received town rights from the archbishop of Mainz.
 In 1333 it was destroyed by fire.
 In 1525 it was captured by Henry the Middle, Duke of Brunswick-Lüneburg.
 In 1540 Heiligenstadt became the capital of Eichsfeld.
 In the Thirty Years' War of 1618–1648, the city was devastated several times.
 In 1803 it came into possession of Prussia.
 In 1929 the salt-water hydropathic baths were built and in 1950 the town was designated a spa.
 On 9 November 1938, the town synagogue was desecrated. The event is commemorated in a plaque on the building, which is now a residence.
 In October 1989, demonstrations began in Heiligenstadt as part of the Peaceful Revolution in East Germany.
 In 1994, Heiligenstadt became the capital of the new district of Eichsfeld, formed by the amalgamation of the districts of Heiligenstadt and Worbis.

Historical Population 
Population (31 December):

 Data since 1994: Thüringian state office of statistics

Name of the town
Despite the official designation of the town as a spa in 1929 and a 1950 decision by the town council to append the word Soleheilbad (salt-water spa) to its name, it remained officially "Heiligenstadt" (literally Holy City) during the East German  years. In 1990 the city government still used only Heiligenstadt.

However, the post office used Heilbad Heiligenstadt, as did postcard companies and the local savings bank. In fact between 1950 and 1990, the town had the distinction of being referred to in three different ways: as Heiligenstadt, Heilbad Heiligenstadt, or Heiligenstadt (Eichsf.) (for Eichsfeld).

In 1990, the town council and especially the mayor began expanding the spa business and it took on increasing importance. In addition, after German reunification, there were several Heiligenstadts in Germany. Initially the government declined to rename the town Heilbad Heiligenstadt because of a lack of evidence that it was a spa, but the town lodged an appeal and used the one and a half years before an official visit and the relative lack of oversight immediately after reunification to create spa facilities and integrate the word Heilbad into official usage. Permission for the renaming was then granted since the town was evidently a spa and using that name.

Culture and sights

Theatre 
 Eichsfeld Kulturhaus

Museums 
 Theodor Storm Literary Museum
 Eichsfeld Heimatmuseum (local history collection)
 Heiligenstadt (Ost) Station Museum
 The Borderland Museum Eichsfeld is located a few miles outside the city of Heiligenstadt and deals with the inner-German border and the history of the GDR

Buildings and monuments 
 Mainz Schloss, seat of the administrator for Eichsfeld when it was a dominion of the Archbishopric of Mainz
 Klausmühle (1748 Fachwerk mill on the site of the birthplace of Tilman Riemenschneider)
 Einheitsdenkmal German Unity Monument in front of the town administration building, 2009

Churches and chapels 
 St. Aegidius, also known as the Neustädter Kirche (new-town church): begun in the 13th century
 St. Mary's, also known as the Altstädter Kirche (old-town church), Liebfrauenkirche (Our Lady's) and Propsteikirche (abbey church): a 14th-century monastic foundation which replaced a 13th-century Romanesque building
 St. Anne's chapel, possibly built as an ossuary, facing the north portico of St. Mary's
 St. Martin's, also known as the Bergkirche (mountain church)
 Monastery of the Congregation of the Most Holy Redeemer and St. Gerhard's church, also known as the Paterkloster
 St. Nicholas', also known as the Klausbergkirche
 Klöppelsklus
 Convent of the Sisters of Mary Magdalene Postel, with convent church and school church

Cemeteries 
 The Jewish cemetery in Ibergstraße was last used for burial in 1940. The deportation of six Jewish residents to Theresienstadt concentration camp in September 1942 put an end to a Jewish community in the town which was first mentioned in writing in 1212 and which had built a synagogue and their own school in the 19th century.
 The Soviet cemetery and monument in Dingelstädter Straße commemorate 70 Soviet prisoners of war and impressed workers who died in the town due to forced labour during World War II.

Parks
 Heinrich Heine Kurpark (spa park)

Regular events
Heiligenstadt, like the rest of Eichsfeld, is traditionally Roman Catholic, so there are several annual religious events, in particular the procession through the old town on Palm Sunday with life-size figures from the Passion of Christ, which attracts numerous believers from the region and the rest of Germany.

Ibergrennen
The Ibergrennen is an annual road race held since 1994 on the last weekend in June on Landesstraße 2022 (Holzweg) in the western foothills of the Iberg. Sponsored by the German Mountain Cup and German Mountain Championship, it has included sports and touring cars since 1998, when the road surface was renewed and the barriers reinforced. In 2000, the course was extended from 1.96 km to 2.05 km. The climb remains 200 m. It is thus one of the shortest mountain race routes in Germany, but not without challenges.

The drivers' encampment is traditionally set up near the centre of Heiligenstadt, next to a filling station and a supermarket which is open on Sundays.

The first race was held in 1925, but only for motorcycles.

People associated with Heilbad Heiligenstadt

Honorary citizens
 Johann Vinzenz Wolf (1743–1826), Jesuit historian
 1991: Hugo Dornhofer, Christian labour union official and CDU politician

Natives

 Tilman Riemenschneider (c. 1460–1531), sculptor
 Johann Melchior Birkenstock (1738–1809), Austrian politician and school reformer
 Josepha von Siebold (1771–1849), gynaecologist, the first credentialled midwife in Germany.
 Eduard Strecker (1822–1894), politician
 Ludwig Loewe (1837–1886), politician
 Helene Keßler (1870–1957), writer, under the pseudonym Hans von Kahlenberg
 Siegfried Loewenthal (1874–1951), chief justice in West Berlin 1945–1951, honorary citizen of Heiligenstadt 1948–1951
 Horst Sannemüller (1918–2001), violinist and leader of the Leipzig Gewandhaus Orchestra
 Wilhelm Friese (1924–2008), professor of Scandinavian studies
 Karl-Hermann Steinberg (1941-2021), chemist and politician
 Wolfgang Thüne (born 1949), Olympic medallist in gymnastics
 Joachim Knape (born 1950), professor of rhetoric
 Bernhard Germeshausen (born 1951), Olympic medallist in bobsleigh
 Dietrich Klinge (born 1954), sculptor and graphic designer
 Angelika Weiz (born 1954), singer
 Dieter Althaus (born 1958), politician (CDU) Ministerpresident of Thuringia 2003–09
 Peter Pysall (born 1960), handball player and coach
 Sebastian Haupt (born 1985), skeleton racer

Others

 Saint Aureus of Mainz (5th century), Bishop of Mainz: some of his remains were reinterred in Heiligenstadt and he is the patron saint of the town.
 Burchard of Worms (c. 965–20 August 1025), consecrated Bishop of Worms in Heiligenstadt in 1000.
 Adolf I of Nassau (1353–1390), Archbishop of Mainz, died in Heiligenstadt.
 Athanasius Kircher (1602–1680), Jesuit scholar, taught in Heiligenstadt.
 Hadrian Daude (1704–1755), Jesuit theologian, taught in Heiligenstadt.
 Friedrich Christian Adolf von Motz (1775–1830), Prussian statesman, was Director of Finance in Heiligenstadt.
 Heinrich Heine (1797–1856), poet and journalist, was baptised a Protestant in Heiligenstadt in June 1825.
 Johann Carl Fuhlrott (1803–1877), natural historian, taught in Heiligenstadt.
 Heinrich Maria Waldmann (1811–1896), theologian and teacher in Heiligenstadt, a representative in the Frankfurt Parliament of 1848/49.
 Theodor Storm (1817–1888), author, judge in Heiligenstadt from 1856 to 1864.
 Friedrich Wilhelm Grimme (1827–1887), author and botanist, was director of the Catholic gymnasium in Heiligenstadt.
 Werner Hagedorn (1831–1894), surgeon, educated in Heiligenstadt.
 Anton Thraen (1843–1902), astronomer, educated in Heiligenstadt.
 Karl Wisniewski (1844–1904), composer, worked in Heiligenstadt from 1885 on.
 Hermann Iseke (1856–1907), poet
 Andreas Huke (1876–1962), politician, worked and lived in Heiligenstadt.
 Ludolf Hermann Müller (1882–1959), Protestant Bishop of Saxony, had been a minister in Heiligenstadt.
 Karl Paul Haendly (1891–1965), author and politician, died in Heiligenstadt.
 Erich Gerberding (1921–1986), actor, member of the Heiligenstadt theatre.
 Johannes Dyba (1929–2000), Bishop of Fulda, educated in Heiligenstadt.
 Joachim Meisner (born 1933), Archbishop of Cologne, previously chaplain at St. Egidius' church in Heiligenstadt.
 Georg Sterzinsky (born 1936), Archbishop of Berlin, previously chaplain at St. Egidius' church in Heiligenstadt.
 Heinz-Josef Durstewitz (born 1945), Catholic dissenter in the GDR, now Provost of Heiligenstadt.
 Reinhard Hauke (born 1953), Auxiliary bishop of Erfurt, previously chaplain at St. Egidius' church in Heiligenstadt.
 Manfred Grund (born 1955), politician, active in Heiligenstadt.

References

Sources
 Johann Vinzenz Wolf. Geschichte und Beschreibung der Stadt Heiligenstadt mit Urkunden. Göttingen: Beyersche Universitätsdruckerei, 1800. At Google Books
 Hans Patze (Ed.) "Heiligenstadt". In: Thüringen: Handbuch der historischen Stätten Deutschlands, Volume 9. Stuttgart: Alfred-Kröner-Verlag, 1989. . pp. 186–190.
 Carl Duval. "Heiligenstadt". In: Das Eichsfeld. Repr. Hannover-Dören: Harro von Hirschheydt Verlag, 1979. . pp. 422–489.
 Karl J. Hüther. Vom Jesuitenkolleg zum Staatlichen Gymnasium in Heiligenstadt. Heiligenstadt: F.W. Cordier,1995. .
 Enno Bünz. "Heiligenstadt als geistliches Zentrum des Eichsfeldes. Das Kollegiatstift St. Martin und seine Kanoniker". Zeitschrift des Vereins für Thüringische Geschichte 62 (2008) 9-48.
 Bernhard Opfermann. Gestalten des Eichsfeldes: Ein biographisches Lexikon. Heiligenstadt: Cordier, 1999, .

External links

 www.heilbad-heiligenstadt.de - official homepage of Heilbad Heiligenstadt

Spa towns in Germany
Eichsfeld (district)
Holocaust locations in Germany